Hotel Energy Management is the practice of controlling procedures, operations and equipment that contribute to the energy use in a hotel operation. This can include electricity, gas, water or other natural resources. Because hotels can have complicated operations and extensive facilities they utilize many different types of energy resources. Hotel energy usages are tracked and classified by the U.S. Department of Energy and statistics are regularly published in the Energy Information Administration annual reports.

Current practices
Modern practices to control energy usage includes contributions by the guests themselves which has been popularized by information cards requesting guests to save water by letting hotel housekeeping staff know if they would care to re-use towels and bed linens. This reduces the amount of water and/or cleaning substances used by the hotel laundry department which also reduces the expense to the property owner or manager.

Recently consultants have developed entire organizations for advising hotels regarding inefficient usage of energy and optimizing its usage. Some of these consultants participate by providing the products to implement their advice for a share of the cost savings as their consideration. These companies have proliferated over the years as public and business energy concerns grow and are popularly known as ESCO's (Energy Service Companies). Other practices include using Infrared motion sensors, door contacts, and other means to detect occupancy to control the Heating, Ventilating and Air Conditioning systems (HVAC) when guests forget to switch off when they leave their room.  Turning off the lights when a room is not occupied is called smart lighting.

Hotel facility managers are using cloud-based software nowadays to manage their energy efficiency projects. The Department of Energy (DOE) Software Directory describes EnergyActio software, a cloud based platform designed for this purpose.  

Energy management markets in general have been going through several changes including the shift to service based models or performance contracted models used by Energy Services Companies (ESCOs).  Traditionally ESCOs did not address the hotel segment because of the small values associated with hotel energy retrofits and the difficulty in measuring so many potential load sources.

References

Hospitality management
Energy conservation